The 2022 Itzulia Women was a women's cycle stage race that was held in the Basque Country from 13 to 15 May 2022. The 2022 edition of the race was the first running of the Itzulia Women, being held as part of the UCI Women's World Tour.

Route 
The race uses the hilly landscape of the Basque Country, with thirteen categorised climbs over the 3 stages.

Classification leadership table 

 On stage 2 & 3, Pauliena Rooijakkers, who was second in the points classification, wore the green jersey, because first placed Demi Vollering wore the violet jersey as the leader of the general classification. For the same reason, on stage 2, Heidi Franz, who was second in the mountains classification, wore the red jersey.

See also 
 2022 in women's road cycling

References 

2022 in women's road cycling
2022 in Spanish road cycling
March 2022 sports events in Spain